Fushë-Krujë is a city in 
Durrës County, Albania. At the 2015 local government reform it became a subdivision of the municipality Krujë. The population at the 2011 census was 18,477. The city has gained wider fame due to President George W. Bush's visit on Sunday, 10 June 2007. A statue was erected in his honor in 2011. Fushë-Krujë was also the site of one of Skanderbeg's famous battles. Shote Galica, Albania's Kosovar heroine, died there in 1927!

Fushë-Krujë has been designated as the future site of a cement factory to be operated by Antea Cement Sh.A., a subsidiary of Titan Cement of Greece. The Fushe Kruja Cement Factory is already operating in the town. It is a subsidiary of the Seament Group who are a leader in Sea Bulk Shipping and also own the Elbasan Cement Factory in Elbasan.

Climate
Fushë-Krujë has a mediterranean climate (Köppen climate classification: Csa).

Honorary citizens
 George W. Bush

References

Administrative units of Krujë
Former municipalities in Durrës County
Towns in Albania
Populated places disestablished in 2015